Daniel Vélez (8 October 1973 – 23 June 2021) was a Colombian professional footballer who played as a goalkeeper.

Career
Born in Medellín, Vélez played for Once Caldas, Independiente Medellín, Atlético Bucaramanga, Alianza Petrolera, Santa Fe (winning the 2009 Copa Colombia), Deportivo Pereira and Envigado, as well as two clubs in Venezuela, Portuguesa and Guaros.

He also represented the Colombia under-20 team, playing for them at the 1992 South American U-20 Championship and the 1993 FIFA World Youth Championship.

On 23 June 2021, Vélez died of COVID-19.

References

1973 births
2021 deaths
Colombian footballers
Colombia under-20 international footballers
Independiente Medellín footballers
Independiente Santa Fe footballers
Deportivo Pereira footballers
Atlético Bucaramanga footballers
Once Caldas footballers
Envigado F.C. players
Portuguesa F.C. players
Guaros F.C. players
Association football goalkeepers
Colombian expatriate footballers
Colombian expatriate sportspeople in Venezuela
Expatriate footballers in Venezuela
Deaths from the COVID-19 pandemic in Colombia
Alianza Petrolera F.C. players
Footballers from Medellín